Sergey Orlovskiy (Russian: Сергей Орловский) is the founder and CEO of Nival, one of the oldest game development companies in Eastern Europe. In addition to heading Nival, Orlovskiy is a member of the board of directors of Alawar Entertainment.

Early life
Sergey Orlovskiy was born in Magadan, Russia, on September 15, 1972.

Nival history

Nival was founded in 1996 as a PC game developer of stand-alone games. It started to self-publish games in 2005.

In 2006, Orlovskiy created the Nival spin-off named Nival Online and raised US $20 million from Digital Sky Technologies (DST) to focus on online game development and publishing. In 2008, Nival Online was merged with Astrum and in 2009 sold to Mail.ru under the Astrum Nival name, to be integrated into the Mail.ru games division. This game development group inside Mail.ru is still referred to as the Allods Team after Allods Online.

In 2010, Digital Sky Technologies and 1C invested US$5 million to acquire a minority stake in Nival.

In 2013, Nival raised US$6 million in its Series A funding round led by Almaz Capital. The funds will be used for global expansion.

Recognition
Orlovskiy typically gives a keynote at the Russian Games Developers Conference KRI,. In his speech "Playing with God" in 2009, he predicted the start of cross-platform gaming as a frontier and a challenge for the game industry.

In 2009, Orlovskiy was included in Top 20 influential people in MMO of 2009 by MOG.

In 2012, Orlovskiy was appointed by the Ministry of Communications and Mass Media to an Expert Council on the development of the IT industry in the Russian Federation.

In 2015, Orlovskiy was called the most famous person in the Russian/CIS gaming industry.

Personal life
As of 2016 he was living in Limassol, Cyprus.

Game credits
Sergey Orlovskiy is credited on the following games:
 Sea Legends (1996) - Programmer
 Rage of Mages (1998) - Executive Producer and Design
 Rage of Mages II: Necromancer (1999) - Executive Producer and Game Design
 Evil Islands: Curse of the Lost Soul (2000) - Executive Producer and Game Design
 Etherlords (2001) - Executive Producer, Conception and Game Design
 Blitzkrieg (2003) - Executive Producer and Game Design
 Silent Storm (2003) - Executive Producer
 Silent Storm: Sentinels (2004) - Executive Producer	
 Blitzkrieg: Rolling Thunder (2004) - Executive Producer and Game Design
 Blitzkrieg: Burning Horizon (2004) - Executive Producer and Game Design
 Blitzkrieg 2 (2005) - Executive Producer	
 Hammer & Sickle (2005) - Producer	
 Night Watch (2005) - Producer 
 Heroes of Might and Magic V (2006) - Executive Producer	
 Heroes of Might and Magic V: Hammers of Fate (2006) - Executive Producer 
 Blitzkrieg 2: Fall of the Reich (2006) - Executive Producer
 Blitzkrieg 2: Liberation (2007) - Executive Producer
 Heroes of Might and Magic V: Tribes of the East (2007) - Executive Producer
 Entis Fantasy (2007) - Executive Producer
 Allods Online (2009) - General Producer
 King's Bounty: Legions (2011) - Executive Producer
 Prime World (2012) - Executive Producer
 Prime World: Emaki (2012) - Executive Producer
 Prime World: Alchemy (2012) - Executive Producer
 Prime World: Defenders (2013) - Executive Producer
 Etherlords (2014) - Executive Producer
 InMind (2015) - Executive Producer
 Defenders 2 (in development) - Executive Producer
 Blitzkrieg 3 - Executive Producer

References

1972 births
Living people
Moscow State University alumni
People from Magadan
Russian emigrants to Cyprus
Russian video game designers
Video game businesspeople
Video game producers
Russian people in the video game industry